Please add names of notable painters with a Wikipedia page, in precise English alphabetical order, using U.S. spelling conventions. Country and regional names refer to where painters worked for long periods, not to personal allegiances.

Raoul Ubac (1910–1985), French painter, sculptor and engraver
Paolo Uccello (1397–1475), Italian painter noted for pioneering work on visual perspective in art
Aguri Uchida (内田あぐり, born 1949), Japanese nihonga painter
Géza Udvary (1872–1932), Hungarian painter
Uemura Shōen (上村 松園, 1875–1949), Japanese painter
Euan Uglow (1932–2000), English painter
Fritz von Uhde (1848–1911), German painter
Jacob van der Ulft (1621–1689), Dutch painter, print-maker and architect
Ryuzaburo Umehara (梅原龍三郎, 1888–1986), Japanese painter
Unkoku Togan (梅原龍三郎, 1547–1618), Japanese painter
Michelangelo Unterberger (1695–1753), Austro-Hungarian (Tyrolean) painter
Uragami Gyokudō (浦上玉堂, 1745–1820), Japanese painter, calligrapher and musician
Modest Urgell (1839–1919), Spanish painter, illustrator and playwright
Federico Uribe (born 1962), Colombian/American artist
Jenaro de Urrutia Olaran (1893–1965), Spanish painter and muralist
Lesser Ury (1861–1931), German painter and print-maker
Simon Ushakov (1626–1686), Russian graphic artist
Utagawa Hirokage (歌川広景, fl 1855–1865), Japanese ukiyo-e woodblock designer
Utagawa Hiroshige II (二代目歌川広重, 1829–1869), Japanese ukiyo-e designer
Utagawa Kunimasa (歌川国政, 1773–1810), Japanese ukiyo-e designer
Utagawa Kunimasu (歌川国升, fl. 17th, 18th or 19th c.), Japanese kamigata-e print designer
Utagawa Kunisada (歌川国貞,1786–1865), Japanese ukiyo-e woodblock designer
Utagawa Kunisada II (歌川国貞, 1823–1880), Japanese ukiyo-e print designer
Utagawa Kunisada III (歌川国貞, 1848–1920), Japanese ukiyo-e print-maker
Utagawa Kuniyoshi (歌川國芳, 1797–1861), Japanese ukiyo-e woodblock print-maker and painter
Utagawa Toyoharu (歌川豊春, 1735–1814), Japanese ukiyo-e artist
Utagawa Toyokuni (歌川豊国, 1769–1825), Japanese ukiyo-e print-maker
Utagawa Yoshiiku (歌川芳幾, 1833–1904), Japanese artist
Utagawa Yoshitaki (歌川芳滝, 1841–1899), Japanese ukiyo-e woodblock print designer
Utagawa Yoshitora (歌川芳虎, fl. 1850–1850), Japanese ukiyo-e woodblock print designer and illustrator
Utagawa Yoshitsuya (歌川芳艶, 1822–1866), Japanese ukiyo-e woodblock print designer
Jacob van Utrecht (1479–after 1525), Flemish/German painter and Protestant Reformation figure
Maurice Utrillo (1883–1955), French painter
Moses van Uyttenbroeck (1600–1646), Dutch painter and etcher
Dechko Uzunov (1899–1986), Bulgarian painter
Charles Uzzell-Edwards (born 1968), Welsh graffiti artist

References
References can be found under each entry.

U